The following television stations operate on virtual channel 34 in the United States:

 K14GW-D in Corvallis, Oregon
 K14MQ-D in Coos Bay, Oregon
 K14PH-D in Baudette, Minnesota
 K14QP-D in Woodward, etc., Oklahoma
 K16JW-D in Ridgecrest, California
 K19GH-D in Eugene, etc., Oregon
 K19KT-D in Hobbs, New Mexico
 K23OS-D in London Springs, Oregon
 K28NZ-D in Florence, Oregon
 K30BN-D in Coos Bay, Oregon
 K30JP-D in Sayre, Oklahoma
 K32FI-D in Yoncalla, Oregon
 K32JL-D in Powers, Oregon
 K34EU-D in Morongo Valley, California
 K34GM-D in Pierre, South Dakota
 K34HO-D in Willmar, Minnesota
 K34IC-D in Glide, Oregon
 K34IN-D in Beaver, Oklahoma
 K34JK-D in Elk City, Oklahoma
 K34MC-D in Williams, Minnesota
 K34MX-D in Odessa, Texas
 K35MS-D in Canyonville, etc., Oregon
 K36IY-D in Weatherford, Oklahoma
 K36NR-D in Seiling, Oklahoma
 K36NV-D in Strong City, Oklahoma
 K40IS-D in Cottage Grove, Oregon
 KACA-LD in Modesto, California
 KBCI-LD in Bonners Ferry, Idaho
 KBRO-LD in Lyons, Colorado
 KCBT-LD in Bakersfield, California
 KCOR-CD in San Antonio, Texas
 KEVA-LD in Boise, Idaho
 KFTU-CD in Tucson, Arizona
 KFVT-LD in Wichita, Kansas
 KGPX-TV in Spokane, Washington
 KIDV-LD in Albany, Texas
 KITU-TV in Beaumont, Texas
 KJJM-LD in Dallas & Mesquite, Texas
 KJTV-TV in Lubbock, Texas
 KLSR-TV in Eugene, Oregon
 KMBA-LD in Austin, Texas
 KMCC in Laughlin, Nevada
 KMEX-DT in Los Angeles, California
 KMJD-LD in Kalispell, Montana
 KOCB in Oklahoma City, Oklahoma
 KSJF-CD in Poteau, Oklahoma
 KTLP-LD in Pueblo, Colorado
 KUVM-CD in Missouri City, Texas
 KWMO-LD in Hot Springs, Arkansas
 KXNW in Eureka Springs, Arkansas
 KXPI-LD in Pocatello, Idaho
 KYDF-LD in Corpus Christi, Texas
 KZCZ-LD in College Station, Texas
 W18ES-D in Mansfield, Ohio
 W18ET-D in Birmingham, Alabama
 W21EB-D in Clarksburg, West Virginia
 W22FA-D in Mayaguez, Puerto Rico
 W27DU-D in Traverse City, Michigan
 W29EW-D in Willsboro, New York
 W33ED-D in Vieques, Puerto Rico
 W34DV-D in Booneville, Mississippi
 W34EQ-D in Bangor, Maine
 W34ER-D in Clarksdale, Mississippi
 W34FO-D in Augusta, Georgia
 W34FW-D in Jasper, Florida
 W34FX-D in Montrose, Georgia
 WACN-LD in Raleigh, North Carolina
 WBGS-LD in Bowling Green, Kentucky
 WNGT-CD in Smithfield-Selma, North Carolina
 WDFX-TV in Ozark, Alabama
 WEDE-CD in Arlington Heights, Illinois
 WIDO-LD in Wilmington, North Carolina
 WIPX-LD in Indianapolis, Indiana
 WIVT in Binghamton, New York
 WJHJ-LD in Newport News, etc., Virginia
 WJNK-LD in Nashville, Tennessee
 WKXT-LD in Morristown, Tennessee
 WMPJ-LD in Calhoun City, Mississippi
 WNIT in South Bend, Indiana
 WODH-LD in Jacksonville, Florida
 WOSU-TV in Columbus, Ohio
 WPXO-LD in East Orange, New Jersey
 WQAV-CD in Glassboro, New Jersey
 WRBJ-TV in Magee, Mississippi
 WSCG in Baxley, Georgia
 WTVX in Fort Pierce, Florida
 WTXX-LD in Springfield, Massachusetts
 WUVG-DT in Athens, Georgia
 WVTT-CD in Olean, New York
 WWTW in Senatobia, Mississippi
 WYOW in Eagle River, Wisconsin

The following stations, which are no longer licensed, formerly operated on virtual channel 34:
 K02RM-D in Wendover, Nevada
 K34KX-D in Rolla, Missouri
 K34KY-D in Mountain Home, Idaho
 K34LR-D in Salinas, California
 KEFB in Ames, Iowa
 KMZM-LD in Cedar Falls, Iowa
 KQLD-LD in Lincoln, Nebraska
 W34ED-D in Trujillo Alto, Puerto Rico
 W34EH-D in Champaign, Illinois
 WBKI-TV in Campbellsville, Kentucky

References

34 virtual